Voices of Spring (German: Frühlingsstimmen) is a 1952 Austrian musical film directed by Hans Thimig and starring Paul Hörbiger, Hans Jaray and Senta Wengraf. It is part of the operetta film genre.

It was shot at the Sievering Studios in Vienna. The film's sets were designed by the art director Felix Smetana.

Cast
 Paul Hörbiger as Lukas, Hausmeister  
 Hans Jaray as Rektor der Wiener Sängerknaben  
 Senta Wengraf as Grete  
 Fritz von Friedl as Hans  
 Susi Nicoletti as Rosi  
 Christl Mardayn as Madame Hartmann 
 Adrienne Gessner as Directrice  
 Alma Seidler as Tante Anna Böhm  
 Franz Marischka as Egon Pilz, Pianist  
 Josef Kepplinger as Kapellmeister Spielmann  
 Ilka Windish as Mannequin 
 Wiener Sängerknaben as Die Sängerknaben

References

Bibliography 
 James Robert Parish. Film Actors Guide. Scarecrow Press, 1977.

External links 
 

1952 films
Austrian historical musical films
1950s historical musical films
1950s German-language films
Films directed by Hans Thimig
Films set in the 19th century
Operetta films
Films shot at Sievering Studios